The genus Orthopneumovirus consists of pathogens that target the upper respiratory tract within their specific hosts. Every orthopneumovirus is characterized as host-specific, and has a range of diseases involved with respiratory illness. Orthopneumoviruses can cause diseases that range from a less-severe upper-respiratory illness to severe bronchiolitis or pneumonia. Orthopneumoviruses are found among sheep, cows, and most importantly humans. In humans, the orthopneumovirus that specifically impacts infants and small children is known as human respiratory syncytial virus.

Taxonomy

Other viruses in this taxon include canine pneumovirus.

Characteristics
The genus Orthopneumovirus is included in the family Pneumoviridae. Orthopneumoviruses are found specifically in the members of the species Homo sapiens, Ovis aries, Capra aegagrus hircus, Bos primigenius, and the order Rodentia.

The most common pneumoviruses are as follows:

•Homo sapiens: human respiratory syncytial virus

•Bos primigenius: bovine respiratory syncytial virus

•Rodentia: murine pneumonia virus

Symptoms
Mild symptoms may include rhinitis, coughing, and decreased appetite. More serious symptoms include wheezing, difficulty breathing, fever, bronchiolitis and pneumonia.

Risk factors
Having a weak immune system and pre-existing conditions such as asthma can be leading factors in catching an orthopneumovirus. In elderly adults, having chronic heart or lung disease is also risk factor. Being in close proximity to a host who has been infected with an orthopneumovirus can also be a risk since most  transmission happens via respiratory.

Diagnosis
Transmission of an infectious agent by another person or animal can be through blood, needles, blood transfusion, a mother to fetus, coughing, sneezing, saliva, or air transmission. Healthcare providers will determine the severity of the virus and possible treatment options. Healthcare providers will also decide if hospitalization is needed for more intense cases.

Treatment
Treatment plans are not specific and are based upon a specific host's current symptoms. Pain relievers or nonsteroidal anti-inflammatory drugs such as acetaminophen or ibuprofen can be prescribed.  Isolation is the first course of action for the infected host. In more serious cases hospitalization may be necessary and supplemental oxygen may be used to aid in oxygen intake. In severe viral detection, intubation and the use of a mechanical ventilation will be inserted as a breathing apparatus.

Prevention
The best methods of prevention of orthopneumovirus infection are covering cough and sneezing to prevent transmission of possible pathogens. Isolating animals and humans that have a pneumovirus is the best way to prevent the virus from spreading. Molecular studies have been on the rise due to continuing materials and information obtained regarding recombinant DNA arrangements that might offer a foundation for vaccine development. Currently animals are able to receive vaccines specific to their virus strand.  During cold and peak flu season, infants and small children have the option to receive monthly injections of small medication doses at a weak strength to help prevent virus/ host attachment.

Cases
Human respiratory syncytial virus (HRSV) is the most known orthopneumovirus because of its direct correlation and importance in humans. RSV is the leading viral agent among pneumoviruses in pediatric upper respiratory diseases globally. New pneumoviruses have been discovered in the Netherlands among 28 children according to studies. Certain studies have isolated the children in hospitals to identify specific causes, contagion levels, and treatment options among those children.

References

Pneumoviridae
Virus genera